Gunnar Stensland (11 January 1922 – 24 November 2011) was a Norwegian association football midfielder and coach.

In Norway he played for Ålgård FK and Viking FK. He played 58 games and scored two goals for Viking from 1947 to 1950. In his time with Viking, he was part of their Cup winning team against Skeid in 1947. Later, he played two games for FC Nancy in France, the forerunner of AS Nancy. He was coach of Viking from 1951 to 1952, Ålgård in 1956 and Stålkameratene in 1965.

He was born in Ålgård, attended school in Ålgård and Hana and police academy in Sweden. He worked in the police until retiring in 1979. He died in November 2011.

References

1922 births
2011 deaths
Association football midfielders
Norwegian footballers
Ålgård FK players
Viking FK players
AS Nancy Lorraine players
Ligue 1 players
Norwegian expatriate footballers
Expatriate footballers in France
Norwegian expatriate sportspeople in France
Norwegian expatriate sportspeople in Sweden
Norwegian football managers
Viking FK managers
Norwegian police officers
People from Gjesdal
Sportspeople from Rogaland